The Sea and the Sky is a 2004 collaborative album by North Carolina-based singer-songwriter Jonathan Byrd and Georgia-based world music duo, Dromedary (Andrew Reissiger & Rob McMaken).

Track listing 
All songs written by Jonathan Byrd
 "True Companion" (5:38)
 "The Yound Slaver" (3:51)
 "I've Been Stolen" (2:58)
 "Gold Coast" (4:23)
 "I'm So Lost" (3:26)
 "Verdigris (Intro)" (0:52)
 "Verdigris" (3:50)
 "Little Bird" (3:19)
 "The New World" (3:43)
 "The River Girl" (3:23)
 "The Sea and the Sky" (5:12)
 "For You" (5:00)

Credits

Musicians
 Jonathan Byrd – vocals, Steel-string acoustic guitar, Flamenco guitar & vocals
 Rob McMaken – Appalachian dulcimer, mandolin, cümbüs, ???, & vocals
 Andrew Reissiger – Charango, electric guitar, flamenco guitar, ???
 Jason Cade – Fiddle, flute, & background Vocals 
 Chris Frank – Accordion  
 Robbie Link – Bass, cello
 Rex McGee – Fiddle

Production
Jerry Brown – Producer, engineer
Charlie Pilzer – Mastering

Artwork
 Jan Burger

Collaborative albums
Jonathan Byrd (musician) albums
2004 albums